Shenzhou (see ) is a spacecraft developed and operated by China to support its crewed spaceflight program, China Manned Space Program. Its design resembles the Russian Soyuz spacecraft, but it is larger in size. The first launch was on 19 November 1999 and the first crewed launch was on 15 October 2003. In March 2005, an asteroid was named 8256 Shenzhou in honour of the spacecraft.

Etymology 
The literal meaning of the native name  (p: Shénzhōu) is "the Divine vessel [on the Heavenly River]", to which Heavenly River means the Milky Way in Classical Chinese.  is a pun and neologism that plays on the poetic word referring to China, meaning Divine realm, which bears the same pronunciation. For further information, refer to Chinese theology, Chinese astronomy and names of China.

History 

China's first efforts at human spaceflight started in 1968 with a projected launch date of 1973. Although China successfully launched an uncrewed satellite in 1970, its crewed spacecraft program was cancelled in 1980 due to a lack of funds.

The Chinese crewed spacecraft program was relaunched in 1992 with Project 921. The Phase One spacecraft followed the general layout of the Russian Soyuz spacecraft, with three modules that could separate for reentry. China signed a deal with Russia in 1995 for the transfer of Soyuz technology, including life support and docking systems. The Phase One spacecraft was then modified with the new Russian technology. The general designer of Shenzhou-1 through Shenzhou-5 was Qi Faren (戚发轫, 26 April 1933), and from Shenzhou-6 on, the general design was turned over to Zhang Bainan (张柏楠, 23 June 1962).

The first uncrewed flight of the spacecraft was launched on 19 November 1999, after which Project 921/1 was renamed Shenzhou, a name reportedly chosen by Jiang Zemin. A series of three additional uncrewed flights were carried out. The first crewed launch took place on 15 October 2003 with the Shenzhou 5 mission. The spacecraft has since become the mainstay of the Chinese crewed space program, being used for both crewed and uncrewed missions.

Design 
Shenzhou consists of three modules: a forward orbital module (轨道舱), a reentry module (返回舱) in the middle, and an aft service module (推进舱). This division is based on the principle of minimizing the amount of material to be returned to Earth. Anything placed in the orbital or service modules does not require heat shielding, increasing the space available in the spacecraft without increasing weight as much as it would if those modules were also able to withstand reentry.

 Complete spacecraft data
 Total mass: 
 Length: 
 Diameter: 
 Span:

Orbital module 
The orbital module (轨道舱) contains space for experiments, crew-serviced or crew-operated equipment, and in-orbit habitation. Without docking systems, Shenzhou 1–6 carried different kinds of payload on the top of their orbital modules for scientific experiments.

The Chinese spacecraft docking mechanism (beginning with Shenzhou 8) is based on the Androgynous Peripheral Attach System (APAS).

Up until Shenzhou 8, the orbital module of the Shenzhou was equipped with its own propulsion, solar power, and control systems, allowing autonomous flight. It is possible for Shenzhou to leave an orbital module in orbit for redocking with a later spacecraft, a capability which Soyuz does not possess, since the only hatch between the orbital and reentry modules is a part of the reentry module, and orbital module is depressurized after separation. For future missions, the orbital module(s) could also be left behind on the planned Chinese project 921/2 space station as additional station modules.

In the uncrewed test flights launched, the orbital module of each Shenzhou was left functioning on orbit for several days after the reentry modules return, and the Shenzhou 5 orbital module continued to operate for six months after launch.
 Orbital module data
 Design life: 200 days
 Length: 
 Basic diameter: 
 Maximum diameter: 
 Span: 
 Habitable volume: 
 Mass: 
 RCS Coarse No x Thrust: 16 x 5 N
 RCS Propellants: Hydrazine
 Electrical system: Solar panels, 
 Electric system: 0.50 average kW
 Electric system: 1.20 kW

Reentry module 
The reentry module (返回舱) is located in the middle section of the spacecraft and contains seating for the crew. It is the only portion of Shenzhou which returns to Earth's surface. Its shape is a compromise between maximizing living space and allowing for some aerodynamic control upon reentry.

Reentry module data
 Crew size: 3
 Design life: 20 days (original)
 Length: 
 Basic diameter: 
 Maximum diameter: 
 Habitable volume: 
 Mass: 
 Heat shield mass: 
 Lift-to-drag-ratio (hypersonic): 0.30
 RCS Coarse No x Thrust: 8 x 150 N
 RCS Propellants: Hydrazine

Service module 
The aft service module (推进舱) contains life support and other equipment required for the functioning of Shenzhou.

Service module data
 Design life: 20 days
 Length: 
 Basic diameter: 
 Maximum diameter: 
 Span: 
 Mass: 
 RCS Coarse No x Thrust: 8 x 150 N
 RCS Fine No x Thrust: 16 x 5 N
 RCS Propellants: N2O4 / MMH, unified system with main engine
 Main engine: 4 x 2500 N
 Main engine thrust: 10.000 kN (2,248 lbf)
 Main engine propellants: N2O4 / MMH
 Main engine propellants: 
 Main engine Isp: 290 seconds
 Electrical system: Solar panels,  total
 Electric system: 1.50 average kW
 Electric system: 2.40 kW

Comparison with Soyuz 
Although the Shenzhou spacecraft follows the same layout as the Russian Soyuz spacecraft, it is approximately 10% larger and heavier than Soyuz. It also has a bigger cylindrical orbital module and 4 propulsion engines. There is enough room to carry an inflatable raft in case of a splashdown, whereas Soyuz astronauts must jump into the water and swim. The commander sits in the center seat on both spacecraft. However, the copilot sits in the left seat on Shenzhou and the right seat on Soyuz.

Launch records 
The records information is all from Gunter's space page. All times are in Coordinated Universal Time.

In popular culture
 The Shenzhou was prominently featured in the film Gravity and was used by the main character, STS-157 Mission Specialist Dr. Ryan Stone, to safely return home after the destruction of her spacecraft.
 In Star Trek: Discovery, the Walker class starship USS Shenzhou is named after this spacecraft.

See also 

 863 Program
 Beihang University
 Chinese next-generation crewed spacecraft
 Harbin Institute of Technology
 Long March (rocket family)
 Names of China
 Shuguang
 Tiangong program
 List of human spaceflights to the Tiangong space station

References

Further reading

External links 
 Flickr: Photos tagged with shenzhou, photos likely relating to Shenzhou spacecraft
 Subsystems and Project management of Shenzhou 7

Crewed spacecraft

Space program of the People's Republic of China